Elizabeth Oropesa (born July 17, 1954), also known as La Oropesa, or "Boots" to friends is a Filipina actress. She was a Grand Slam Best Actress winner for Bulaklak Ng Maynila (1999). She was crowned as Miss Luzon of the Miss Republic of the Philippines (RP) 1972. She was one of the Miss White Castle models in the mid-70s. One of her notable roles is Sandra Salgado, the evil stepmother and the main villain in hit soap opera Esperanza. Aside from showbiz assignments and commitments, Oropesa is currently working as a healer.

Career
In 1974, a young Elizabeth Oropesa was introduced in Celso Ad Castillo's Ang Pinakamagandang Hayop Sa Balat Ng Lupa (1974) lending support to former Miss Universe Gloria Diaz, who was then being launched to stardom. She portrayed the role of Saling, the barrio lass who is madly in love with Simon (Vic Vargas) and loathes the presence of Isabel (Gloria Diaz) on the barrio-island. She and Gloria Diaz made a big splash by introducing the "wet look" in Philippine cinema.

Oropesa was launched to stardom in Mister Mo, Lover Boy Ko (1975), produced by Jesse Ejercito and directed by Ishmael Bernal. She won the FAMAS Best Actress award for Lumapit, Lumayo ang Umaga (1975), also directed by Bernal. Again, Bernal directed Oropesa in Nunal sa Tubig (1976), considered one of the best films of the '70s. Oropesa is one of director Ishmael Bernal's favorite actresses to work with.

Other notable movies she made are Alupihan Dagat (1975) and Aguila (1980) with Fernando Poe, Jr.; Si Rafael at Raquel (1976) and Hide and Seek sa Manila, Makati (1977) with Christopher de Leon; Mother and Daughter (1975) with Paraluman and Vic Vargas; Katawang Lupa (1975) with Eddie Gutierrez; Uhaw Na Dagat (1981) with Gloria Diaz and Isabel Rivas; Iking Boxer (1975) with Chiquito; Nueva Vizcaya (1974) with Vic Vargas; Si Malakas, si Maganda at si Mahinhin (1981) with Alma Moreno and Dindo Fernando; and Palabra de Honor (1983) with Eddie Garcia.

In 1987, Oropesa was charged with rebellion by the Northern Police District for her participation in the January 27 takeover of the GMA Network television station.

She received Best Supporting Actress trophies for Milagros (1997) and Sa Pusod ng Dagat (1998), both directed by Marilou Diaz-Abaya, and a Best Actress grand slam, five best actress trophies for Bulaklak Ng Maynila (1999), directed by Joel Lamangan.

She did Mister Mo, Lover Ko (1999) a comedy film again directed by Joel Lamangan, starring Glydel Mercado, Eddie Gutierrez, Gary Estrada and Danny Ramos. In 2003, she made the movie Homecoming, an entry in the Metro Manila Film Festival, directed by Gil Portes, with Alessandra de Rossi, playing a mother and daughter caught in a heart-wrenching homecoming. 
 
She played the mother of Jennica Garcia and stepmother of Jolina Magdangal in GMA's Adik Sa'Yo (2009) with Marvin Agustin, Dennis Trillo and Joey Marquez, directed by Joel Lamangan. She starred in a digital movie Ded Na Si Lolo (2009), about a family staying together and getting stronger amid personal differences and hardships, starring Roderick Paulate, Gina Alajar and Manilyn Reynes. Oropesa made a comeback as a grandmother in the TV drama, Angelito: Batang Ama which aired on ABS-CBN. In 2004, Elizabeth played a villain named Belinda Manalo in Te Amo, Maging Sino Ka Man, the character was bitter and hot-headed. In 2017, she played a role in Impostora in which the character plays is calm and supportive of the main protagonist. In 2018, she was tapped to play the funny arrogant and brainless mother of Amber. Named Violet "Violy" Bolocboc, she is one of the anti-heroines of Pamilya Roces. She and her daughter scheme to become rich, but overall they are anti-heroes.

She has appeared in more than 150 movies and television shows since 1973.

Awards and nominations

Filmography

Film

Television

References

External links

1954 births
Living people
Bicolano actors
Filipino film actresses
People from Albay
Filipino television actresses
ABS-CBN personalities
GMA Network personalities